Associazione Calcio Fiorentina did not manage to repeat its spectacular 1995–96 season, and did not win any trophies the following year. A relatively meagre goalscoring season from superstar Gabriel Batistuta was one of the reasons for the declining performance, which head coach Claudio Ranieri sacked at the end of the season. The highlight of Fiorentina's season was reaching the semi-finals of the Cup Winners' Cup, where it lost to Barcelona 2–0 at the Camp Nou, following a 1–1 draw in Florence.

Players

Transfers

Winter

Competitions

Supercoppa Italiana

Serie A

League table

Results summary

Position by round

Matches

Coppa Italia

Final phase

UEFA Cup Winners' Cup

First round

Second round

Quarter-finals

Semi-finals

Statistics

Players statistics

Goalscorers
  Gabriel Batistuta 13 (2)
  Anselmo Robbiati 12
  Luís Oliveira 9

References

ACF Fiorentina seasons
Fiorentina